Herbert Bickford "Herbie" Steward (May 7, 1926 Los Angeles, California, United States – August 9, 2003 Clearlake, California) was an American jazz saxophonist.  He was widely known for being one of the tenor saxophone players in Four Brothers, part of Woody Herman's Second Herd.

Selected discography
As leader
 So Pretty, Äva Records AVA LP6
 Recorded in Los Angeles, June 5, 1962
 Re-released with all 9 of the 10 cuts on a compilation album: One Brother, Mobile Fidelity (March 19, 1981) 
 Herbie Steward with big band and strings, Dick Hazard, conductor  
 The Three Horns of Herbie Steward, Famous Door HL-139 (1981) 
 Recorded in San Francisco, March 19, 1981
 Herbie Steward (alto sax, clarinet-1, soprano sax-2), Smith Dobson (né Smith Weed Dobson IV; 1947–2001) (piano), Tee Carson (né Tecumseh Donald Carson; 1930–2000) (piano-3), Eddie Duran (né Edward Lozano Duran; born 1925) (guitar), John Mosher (bass), Eddie Moore (drums)
 Herbie's Here, with Gene DiNovi (né Eugene Salvatore Dinovi; born 1928), Marshmallow Exports MYCJ-30069 (Japan) (December 20, 2000)
 Recorded live at OZ, Yamagata, Japan, May 23, 1992
 Magical L-I-V-E + Sir Charles Thompson, Marshmallow Exports MYCJ-30115 (October 8, 2001)
 Recorded live at Little John, Yokohama, May 21, 1992
 Herbie Steward (tenor sax), Sir Charles Thompson (piano), David Young (bass), Yukio Kimura (drums)
 One Morning In May + Gene DiNovi (né Eugene Salvatore Dinovi; born 1928), Marshmallow Exports MMEX-118 (Japan) (2008) 
 Recorded May 19, 1992, Kan Nai Hall, Yokohama
 Herbie Steward (tenor saxophone & clarinet), (né Eugene Salvatore Dinovi; born 1928) (piano), Dave Young (bass), Yukio Kimura (drums)
 Saijoh's Serenade, on 3 tracks with Kohnosuke Saijoh, Marshmallow Exports MYCJ-30083 (May 23, 1992)
 Recorded May 22, 1992
 Kohnosuke Saijoh (tenor sax), Herbie Steward (tenor sax), (né Eugene Salvatore Dinovi; born 1928) (piano), David Young (bass), Yukio Kimura (drums)
With Serge Chaloff, Al Cohn and Zoot Sims
The Four Brothers... Together Again! (Vik, 1957)
with Stan Kenton
Popular Favorites by Stan Kenton (Capitol, 1953)

References

External links
Answers.com
Eastwind Import (discography details)

1926 births
2003 deaths
Musicians from California
Big band saxophonists
Swing saxophonists
Cool jazz saxophonists
Bebop saxophonists
20th-century American musicians
20th-century saxophonists
Äva Records artists
Earle Spencer Orchestra members